Robert Keilway (by 1483 – 1537 or later) was an English politician.

He was a Member (MP) of the Parliament of England for Salisbury in 1523. His son was Robert Keilway, also an MP.

References

15th-century births
16th-century deaths
English MPs 1523